The Delhi–Moradabad line is a railway line connecting Delhi and  the latter in the Indian state of Uttar Pradesh. The Gajraula–Najibabad branch line is included in this line. The line is under the administrative jurisdiction of Northern Railway.

History
The Ghaziabad–Moradabad link was established by Oudh and Rohilkhand Railway in 1900.

Electrification
The  Delhi–Ghaziabad–Hapur–Moradabad line, as of 19 January 2016, is a fully electrified double line and Gajraula–Najibabad branch is also electrified as on 12 April 2019.

Loco shed
Ghaziabad electric loco shed serves the Delhi area.  It housed 47 WAP-1 locos in 2008. It also has WAM-4, WAP-4, WAP-5, WAP-7 and WAG-5HA locos.

Since this stretch is now electrified, this stretch would start seeing electric locomotives mostly.

Passenger movement
Moradabad is the only station on this line that is amongst the top hundred booking stations of Indian Railway. But this station has not any originating Mail/Express train.

References

5 ft 6 in gauge railways in India
Railway lines in Uttar Pradesh
Railway lines opened in 1900